Qeshlaq-e Ilkhchi, also rendered as Qeshlaq-e Ilchi, may refer to:
 Qeshlaq-e Ilkhchi, alternate name of Ilkhchi, Germi
 Qeshlaq-e Ilkhchi-ye Olya
 Qeshlaq-e Ilkhchi-ye Sofla